Kyle Baldock (born 29 March 1991) is a BMX Freestyle Dirt and Park rider from Gold Coast, Australia.

Sanctioned Events  

 2017 X Games Minneapolis - BMX Dirt Best Trick: 1st
 2016 X Games Austin - Park: 3rd / BMX Park Best Trick: 1st
 2015 X Games Austin - Dirt: 1st
2015 Monster Energy Cup BMX Jam - Dirt: 1st
 2014 X Games Austin - Dirt: 1st
2013 Red Bull Farm Jam - Dirt: 1st
 2013 X Games Foz do Iguacu - Drt and Park: 1st
 2012 BMX Worlds, Cologne, Germany - Dirt: 1st
 2011 Alli Dew Tour, Ocean City, MD - Park: 1st
2011 Alli Dew Tour, Salt Lake City, UT - Big Air: 1st
 2009 Core Series Round Two, Queensland, Australia - 1st

References

External links 
 A 22 documentary about Kyle Baldock
 Official website

X Games athletes
Australian male cyclists
Living people
BMX riders
1991 births